Walapane is a town located in Nuwara Eliya District of Sri Lanka. It is a high country area with many green mountains. It was called Wathtumulla in the past. The name Watumulla derived from the former tea factory which was located in the heart of the Walapane town and now demolished since the production of Wattumulla Plantation declined. Walapane is administrated by the government of *Sri Lanka through *Walapane Divisional Secretariat.

History
Walapane was a division controlled by ancient Kandy Kingdom.

Geography
The province has an area of 320 km², a population of 103,152.

Climate

The climate is cool, Walapane is located above 910 metres above sea level, often have chilly nights. Some slopes are very wet, some places having almost 7000 mm of rain per year. Some slopes are parts of the mid-dry zone as it is receiving rain only from North-Eastern monsoon. The temperatures range from 24 °C to just 16 °C in Walapane. The highest mountains in Walapane is. The terrain is mostly mountainous, with deep valleys cutting into it. The two main mountain regions are the Pidurutalagala range.

Demographics
The population is a mixture of Sinhalese, Tamil and the Moors. Many tea plantation workers are Indian Tamils, brought to Sri Lanka by the British in the 19th century.

Ethnicity

Administrative divisions

Walapane Divisional Secretariat.

Divisional Secretariats

The districts of the Sri Lanka are divided into administrative sub-units known as divisional secretariats. These were originally based on the feudal counties, the korales and ratas. They were formerly known as 'D.R.O. Divisions' after the 'Divisional Revenue Officer'. Later the D.R.O.s became 'Assistant Government Agents' and the Divisions were known as 'A.G.A. Divisions'. Currently, the Divisions are administered by a 'Divisional Secretary', and are known as a 'D.S. Divisions'.

There are 36 divisional secretariats divided in Central Province, which are listed below, by district. There are 20 in Kandy District, 11 in Matale District and 5 in Nuwara Eliya District.

Villages of Walapane
Mahauwa
Egodakanda
Harasbedda
Kumbalgamuwa
Manelwala
Rupaha
Karandagolla
Rasingolla
Kumbukwella
Udamadura
Teripaha
Madulla
weralla
napala
Diggala

Small Towns
Walapane
Ragala
Nildandahinna
Padiyapelella
Udapussallawa

See also

Provinces of Sri Lanka
Districts of Sri Lanka
Tea production in Sri Lanka

References

Maps
Searchable Map of Sri Lanka

External links

Central Provincial Council Sri Lanka 
Central Provincial Postal Codes Sri Lanka 
Cities in Central province 

Populated places in Nuwara Eliya District
Towns in Central Province, Sri Lanka